Daiana Alejandra Ocampo (born 16 February 1991) is an Argentine long-distance runner. In 2020, she competed in the women's half marathon at the 2020 World Athletics Half Marathon Championships held in Gdynia, Poland.

References

External links 
 

Living people
1991 births
Place of birth missing (living people)
Argentine female long-distance runners
Argentine female marathon runners
21st-century Argentine women